Blommersia kely is a species of frog in the family Mantellidae.
It is endemic to Madagascar.
Its natural habitats are subtropical or tropical moist montane forests, moist savanna, subtropical or tropical high-altitude grassland, swamps, and heavily degraded former forest.
It is threatened by habitat loss.

References

Mantellidae
Endemic frogs of Madagascar
Amphibians described in 1994
Taxonomy articles created by Polbot